Russell Risley Sage (August 4, 1816 – July 22, 1906) was an American financier, railroad executive and Whig politician from New York. As a frequent partner of Jay Gould in various transactions, he amassed a fortune. Olivia Slocum Sage, his second wife, inherited his fortune, which was unrestricted for her use. In his name she used the money for philanthropic purposes, endowing a number of buildings and institutions to benefit women's education: she established the Russell Sage Foundation in 1907 and founded the Russell Sage College for women in 1916.

Early life and family
Sage was born at Verona in Oneida County, New York. He received a public school education and worked as a farmhand until he was 15. He started as an errand boy in his brother Henry's grocery in Troy, New York. He had a part interest in 1837–1839 in a retail grocery in Troy, and in a wholesale store there in 1839–1857.

On January 23, 1840, Sage married Marie-Henrie Winne, who was also known as "Maria Winne". They had no children. She died on May 7, 1867, of stomach cancer. In 1869 at the age of 53, Sage remarried, to Olivia Slocum (1828–1918), who was ten years younger.

Political career
In 1841, Sage was elected as alderman in Troy. He was re-elected to this office until 1848, while also serving for seven years as treasurer of Rensselaer County. He was elected to the U.S. House of Representatives as a Whig, and served, with re-election as an Oppositionist, from March 4, 1853 until March 3, 1857. He served on the Ways and Means Committee. Sage was the first person to advocate in Congress for the purchase of George Washington's plantation, Mount Vernon, by the government.

Financial career

After retiring from politics Sage settled in New York City, where he engaged in the business of selling puts and calls, as well as short-term options known as privileges. He has been credited with developing the market for stock options in the United States and inventing the "spread" and "straddle" option strategies, for which he was dubbed "Old Straddle" and the "Father of Puts and Calls." He used the options to synthesize loans at a higher interest rate than state usury laws allowed, for which he was convicted in 1869 and fined $500, with a suspended jail sentence.

Sage bought a seat on the New York Stock Exchange in 1874, and became known as a financier. At the same time he saw the future of railroads, and secured stocks in western roads, notably the Chicago, Milwaukee and St. Paul Railway. He was president and vice-president for twelve years. By selling such investments, as the smaller roads were bought by major trunk-lines, he became wealthy. In his later years he was closely associated with Jay Gould in the management of the Wabash Railway, St. Louis and Pacific, Missouri Pacific Railroad, Missouri-Kansas-Texas Railroad, Delaware, Lackawanna and Western Railroad and the St. Louis - San Francisco Railway, for which he was director of the corporations.  He also served as director for the American cable company, the Western Union telegraph company, and the Manhattan consolidated system of elevated railroads in New York City. He was a director of the Union Pacific Railroad, which was part of constructing the transcontinental railroad. Together with other major investors (and railroad robber barons of the nineteenth century), he made a fortune. He was a director and vice-president in the Importers and Traders' National Bank for twenty years, and also a director in the Merchants' Trust Company and in the Fifth Avenue Bank of New York City.

Following the collapse of the Grant & Ward scheme in 1884, Sage faced a run from holders of put options that he had sold. He honored all demands but withdrew from the sale of options soon afterward.

Assassination attempt
In 1891, Henry L. Norcross entered Sage's office in a six-story 1859 brownstone office building at 71 Broadway in Manhattan, claiming he needed to discuss railroad bonds. Norcross gave Sage a letter demanding $1,200,000, which Sage declined to pay. Norcross was carrying a bag of dynamite, which exploded, killing Norcross, wounding Sage, and severely wounding William R. Laidlaw, Jr., a clerk for John Bloodgood and Co. who happened to be in the office. Afterward Laidlaw sued Sage, alleging that he had used him as a shield against Norcross. Disabled for life, Laidlaw aggressively pursued the lawsuits, winning $43,000 in damages after four trials, but a Court of Appeals reversed the award. Sage never paid any settlement and was publicly criticized as a miser because of his great fortune.

Personal life

Sage was known to have affairs outside marriage both before and after the death of his first wife. The writer Paul Sarnoff suggested in his biography of Sage that he may have remarried for appearance's sake, and may never have consummated his second marriage. Sage was reported to have had a child by a young chambermaid.

Sage was a member of East Presbyterian Church on West 42nd Street between Fifth and Sixth Avenue, which later merged with Park Presbyterian to form West-Park Presbyterian.

In 1906 Sage died and left his entire fortune of about $70 million to his wife, Olivia Slocum Sage (1828–1918). He was buried in a mausoleum in Oakwood Cemetery in Troy, New York. The mausoleum is of a Greek style and is intentionally unnamed. To the left of the memorial is a bench which contains a relief of Medusa on the center of the back, complete with snakes as hair.

Legacy and honors

Olivia Sage devoted a major portion of the money she inherited from her husband to philanthropy, including buildings and other memorials to him.  She commissioned Ralph Adams Cram, a leading architect, to design Russell Sage Memorial Church, and for Louis Tiffany to create a large stained glass window as a memorial. Built in 1908, the church was located in Far Rockaway, Queens, where the family had a summer home.

In 1907 she established the Russell Sage Foundation, and in 1916 founded Russell Sage College in Troy. In addition she gave extensively to the Emma Willard School and to Rensselaer Polytechnic Institute (RPI) in Troy, her husband's home town.

During World War II the Liberty ship  was built in Panama City, Florida, and named in his honor.

References
Notes

Bibliography
 Myers, Gustavus. History of the Great American Fortunes, volume iii, (Chicago, 1910)
 Sarnoff, Paul. Russell Sage: The Money King, Ivan Obolensky, Inc. (New York, 1965)

 "Not the Rensselaer Handbook"

External links

"Russell Sage", Internet Accuracy Project
 "Financier Russell Sage Attacked; Dynamite Bomb Nearly Killed Wall Street Titan in 1891" 
Russell Sage (1816–1906) entry at The Political Graveyard

 

 

1816 births
1906 deaths
People from Verona, New York
American Presbyterians
Whig Party members of the United States House of Representatives from New York (state)
Opposition Party members of the United States House of Representatives from New York (state)
19th-century American railroad executives
American financiers
Politicians from Troy, New York
19th-century American politicians
Russell Sage Foundation
Burials at Oakwood Cemetery (Troy, New York)